A forager is a person who collects edible plants or fungi for consumption. Urban foragers may collect in city parks, private lands, and sidewalks. Urban foraging has gained in popularity in the 21st century, as people share their knowledge, experiments, and research about local flora online. One notable urban forager is "Wildman" Steve Brill, who was arrested in New York City's Central Park for eating a dandelion.

Notable foragers include Sean Sherman, a chef who owns "The Sioux Chef" food education business, chef Sami Tallberg, and Alexis Nikole Nelson, a forager and internet personality.

Activities
Foragers typically seek out herbs, fruits, roots, and mushrooms from nature to create dishes to eat. Professional chefs often forage or purchase from foragers in order to add these foods to restaurant menus.

While most foragers engage in the activity as a pastime, foraging can also be a free means of obtaining nutrient-dense food for low-income families, and become a significant part of a person's diet.

See also 
 Ethnobotany
 Farm-to-table
 Food Not Lawns
 Herbal medicine
 List of forageable plants
 Rewilding (anarchism)

References

Foraging
Cuisine